Abidjan is the largest city in Ivory Coast.

Abidjan's history of skyscrapers began with the Ivoire InterContinental Abidjan Hotel Tower I (1969), 	La Pyramide Building (1973), and Immeuble SCIAM in 1975. Buildings in the city remained relatively short in the city until the late 1960s when the city experienced its first skyscraper boom. From 1969 to 1977, Abidjan witnessed a major expansion of skyscraper and high-rise construction. Many of the city's office towers were completed during this period, such as the Immeuble SIB. A near short lull in building construction came after this expansion, with a second, larger boom starting in 1982. Though this expansion was much shorter, lasting only two years, most of the city's iconic buildings were constructed during this time, including La Cité Administrative Tour D, the city's tallest building.

As of 2011, Abidjan had 19 completed high-rise buildings.

Buildings
This includes spires and architectural details but does not include antenna masts.

Under Construction

See also

 List of tallest buildings and structures in South Africa
 List of tallest structures in the world by country
 List of tallest buildings in Nigeria
 List of tallest buildings in Egypt
 List of tallest buildings in Africa
 List of tallest buildings in Nairobi

References

Buildings and structures in Abidjan
Abidjan